Wroten is a surname. Notable people with the surname include:

Claude Wroten (born 1983), American football defensive tackle
Joe Wroten (1925–2005), American politician
Tony Wroten (born 1993), American professional basketball player